is an autobahn in the Region Hannover, Germany. It consists of two parts, one connecting the borough of Hannover-Buchholz to Burgdorf via Altwarmbüchen, the other connecting the Hanover fairground to the A 7. The two parts are linked by the B 3, the whole system is known as the Messeschnellweg (fairground expressway).

During large fairs, for example CeBIT or Hannover Messe, the Messeschnellweg can be transformed to a four-lane one way road on the fly to allow for quicker travel to and from the fairground.

Exit list

 Celle

|-
|colspan="3"|

|}

External links 

37
A037